The Cal State Los Angeles Golden Eagles (also Cal State LA Golden Eagles) are the athletic teams that represent California State University, Los Angeles in NCAA Division II intercollegiate sports. The Golden Eagles compete as members of the California Collegiate Athletic Association for all 10 varsity sports. Cal State LA previously competed in Division I and was a founding member of the Pacific Coast Athletic Association in 1969. It left the conference in 1974, but not before winning the conference's basketball title and becoming the last team no longer in Division I to participate in the NCAA Division I men's basketball tournament.

The sports complex—designation which was approved by the CSU Board of Trustees Sept. 21—features the Eagles Nest Gymnasium, the University Stadium, Jesse Owens Track and Field, Reeder Field (baseball), the swimming pool, and tennis and basketball courts.

History
The Eagles Nest is home to the Cal State LA basketball and volleyball teams. The arena seats just over 3,200 fans at full capacity. In 1984, the Eagles Nest hosted the Summer XXIII (23rd) Olympics judo competition. In July 1984 the Olympic Mural, “Olympic Fantasy,” a mosaic tile work by muralist Guillermo "Bill" Granizo, was installed on west side of the arena in remembrance of the event.

The Fight Song

Championships -- National (Won, Runner-up); Conference (Won)

Entering the 2017–2018 school year, Cal State LA has won a total of 75 conference championships in the university's history. This is in addition to the eight National Championships and 10 National Runner-Up Finishes.

NATIONAL CHAMPIONSHIPS WON

 Men's Tennis - 1963, 1964, 1965
 Football - 1964 (#1 on the UPI poll)
 Men's Track and Field - 1978
 Men's Archery - 1979
 Women's Badminton - 1981
 Men's Soccer - 2021

Women's Tennis
Cal State LA moved its tennis program in 2014 from the California Collegiate Athletic Association to the Pacific West Conference. See NCAA Women's Division II Tennis Championship.

Billie Jean King Sports Complex

Two-story, 8,500 sf facility is sited between the CSULA stadium running track and the university tennis center. The lower level women's and men's locker / training facilities and the public rest rooms are accessible for use by both the stadium and the tennis courts. This allows the university soccer, track and field and tennis teams to share the facilities. The upper level contains both the CSULA Sports Hall of Fame and a hospitality suite with a small serving kitchen. This level is enclosed with floor to ceiling windows and contains a covered outdoor terrace for uninterrupted viewing of both the tennis courts and the stadium soccer field and track. The site surrounding the building includes grandstands for viewing tennis and an outdoor assembly area for university events.

Varsity sports

Football

In 1964, the undefeated Diablos were voted national champions, via the UPI coaches' poll, for the NCAA's College Division.

Cal State LA's football program was disbanded after the 1977 season.

Men's golf
Bob Clark won the NCAA Division I Golf Championship in 1969.

Men's soccer

Since 2018 Michael Erush has been the Head Men's Soccer Coach of the Cal State Los Angeles Golden Eagles at California State University-Los Angeles.

Baseball
During CSULA's time in Division I, the baseball team made two NCAA baseball tournament appearances, including an improbable run to the College World Series in 1977. That year, the Diablos defeated then 10-time-champions USC twice to advance out of the regional, and went 2-2 in the 1977 CWS to finish in 4th place.

Championships

Appearances
The CSU Los Angeles Golden Eagles competed in the NCAA Tournament across 13 active sports (6 men's and 7 women's) 158 times at the Division II level.

 Baseball (4): 1998, 2006, 2007, 2013
 Men's basketball (6): 1957, 1959, 1974, 1995, 1998, 2000
 Women's basketball (2): 2006, 2012
 Men's cross country (5): 1975, 1978, 1987, 1988, 1989
 Women's cross country (8): 1987, 1988, 1989, 1990, 1992, 2006, 2007, 2008
 Men's soccer (14): 1981, 1992, 1994, 2006, 2008, 2009, 2011, 2012, 2013, 2014, 2015, 2017, 2018, 2021
 Women's soccer (5): 2007, 2009, 2010, 2011, 2014
 Women's tennis (9): 1988, 1990, 1992, 1995, 1998, 2004, 2005, 2007, 2008
 Men's indoor track and field (9): 1985, 1987, 1988, 1989, 1990, 1991, 1993, 1996, 2017
 Women's indoor track and field (19): 1991, 1992, 1996, 1997, 1998, 1999, 2001, 2002, 2004, 2005, 2006, 2007, 2008, 2009, 2010, 2011, 2012, 2013, 2018
 Men's outdoor track and field (42): 1976, 1977, 1978, 1979, 1980, 1981, 1982, 1983, 1984, 1985, 1986, 1987, 1988, 1989, 1990, 1991, 1992, 1993, 1994, 1995, 1996, 1997, 1998, 2000, 2001, 2002, 2003, 2004, 2005, 2006, 2007, 2008, 2009, 2010, 2011, 2012, 2013, 2014, 2015, 2016, 2017, 2018
 Women's outdoor track and field (20): 1990, 1991, 1992, 1996, 1997, 1998, 1999, 2001, 2002, 2003, 2004, 2005, 2006, 2007, 2009, 2010, 2011, 2012, 2013, 2018
 Women's volleyball (17): 1992, 1993, 1994, 1995, 1997, 1999, 2000, 2001, 2002, 2004, 2005, 2006, 2007, 2008, 2009, 2010, 2018

The Golden Eagles participated in the 1974 NCAA Division I Basketball Tournament, going 0–1 with an 88–80 loss to Dayton.

Team

The Golden Eagles of CSU Los Angeles earned five NCAA team championships at the Division II level.

 Men's (4)
Outdoor track and field (1): 1978
Soccer (1): 2021
Tennis (3): 1963, 1964, 1965

Results

Below is one national club team championship:

 Men's archery (1): 1979 (USA Archery)

Individual

CSU Los Angeles had 71 Golden Eagles win NCAA individual championships at the Division II level.

At the NCAA Division I level, CSU Los Angeles garnered 12 individual championships.

Baseball Faculty

Baseball Field
The baseball field was officially renamed as Reeder Field in honor of baseball coach Jim Reeder. Reeder never had a losing season prior to his untimely death in January 1972.

John Herbold
On January 3, 1998, Cal State LA head baseball coach John Herbold was inducted into the American Baseball Coaches Association (ABCA) Hall of Fame during the ABCA's national convention in San Diego, CA.

Herbold was later honored by Cal State LA Intercollegiate Athletics for becoming baseball coach with the most wins in University history. Cal State LA has won 398 baseball games since he became head coach in 1984. The previous record of 397 wins was held by Jim Reeder, for whom the baseball field is named.

References

External links
 

 
Sports in Monterey Park, California